Adam Kwasman (born October 28, 1982) is an American attorney, politician, and a former Republican member of the Arizona House of Representatives, representing District 11 from 2013 to 2015. Kwasman ran unsuccessfully for U.S. Congress in 2014. He lives in Scottsdale, Arizona.

Early life and education
Kwasman was born and raised in Tucson, Arizona. He earned his bachelor's degree (Cum Laude) from Tulane University, a master's degree in Economics from George Mason University, and a J.D. degree from the Arizona State University Sandra Day O'Connor College of Law.

Career
Kwasman worked at the Cato Institute’s Center for Constitutional Studies and interned on Capitol Hill for former Congressman Jim Kolbe. Kwasman worked in the United Kingdom for the RAND Corporation, assisting in their research of Islamic terrorism while studying at the Institute for Economics and Politics, a study abroad program in Cambridge, England. In 2009, Kwasman founded his own economic consulting firm advising both private companies and political clients.

Kwasman later co-founded the law firm Wagner & Kwasman in Phoenix, Arizona where he practices personal injury and wrongful death law. Notably, Kwasman represented a former legislative aide in a suit against State Senator Wendy Rogers.

Politics
Kwasman was elected to the Arizona House of Representatives in 2012 alongside Steve Smith defeating Democratic nominee Dave Joseph.

He served as the Vice Chairman on the Ways and Means Committee and also sat on the Appropriations and Commerce Committees.

Policy positions 
Kwasman was given a 100% rating by the American Conservative Union in 2014. 
In 2013, Kwasman was rated "Hero of the Taxpayer" by Americans for Prosperity.

2014 congressional campaign

In 2014, Kwasman sought the Republican nomination for U.S. Congress in Arizona's 1st congressional district. He was defeated in the primary by Andy Tobin and Gary Kiehne.

Illegal Migrant/Bus Incident
In 2014, Kwasman was attending a morning protest over the expected arrival of migrant children being transported to a shelter near Oracle, Arizona. Kwasman spoke with a local reporter and voiced his opposition to locating the children at the shelter. The reporter later informed Kwasman that the school bus in his tweet was actually carrying local children to a YMCA camp. The incident was featured on the Colbert Report.

2020 State Senate Race
Kwasman announced his intention to run for the state senate in Legislative District 23, challenging incumbent republican Michelle Ugenti-Rita. Although he received sufficient signatures, Kwasman dropped out of the race and endorsed Alex Kolodin due to health concerns and the COVID-19 pandemic.

Personal life
Kwasman volunteers teaching economics to high school students through the Junior Achievement program. In August 2014, Kwasman revealed that he had been diagnosed with "a form of slow-growing blood cancer that has presented no symptoms."

Kwasman is a regular political and economic contributor to The Resurgent.

Kwasman is married to political consultant Orit Kwasman (née Sklar), who is the former Development Director of the Faith and Freedom Coalition and a conservative political consultant.

References

Living people
Jewish American state legislators in Arizona
Tulane University alumni
George Mason University alumni
Sandra Day O'Connor College of Law alumni
1982 births
Politicians from Tucson, Arizona
Republican Party members of the Arizona House of Representatives
21st-century American Jews